Daily Info is a morning television newscast aired on  PTV, which was aired from May 8, 2017, to July 31, 2020, replacing Good Morning Pilipinas and was replaced by Rise and Shine Pilipinas. From a 60-minute newscast, it was shortened into a 30-minute program following the launch of Bagong Pilipinas, a morning magazine show aired on the said station on May 17, 2017. It was broadcast at 7:00 am – 8:00 am, then moved to 7:45 am – 8:15 am after Bagong Pilipinas launch.

Anchored by Audrey Gorriceta, and Trixie Jaafar, this show now airs weekdays at 9:00 a.m. to 9:30 a.m. (UTC +08), right after Bitag Live on PTV-4.

On July 31, 2020, Daily Info air their last broadcast due to PTV's programming revamp under the leadership of PTV Network General Manager, Kat de Castro.

Anchors
 Audrey Gorriceta (2017, 2018–2020)
 Trixie Jaafar (main anchor, 2020, PTV InfoWeather, 2017–2020)

Former anchors
 Aljo Bendijo (2017–2018, moved to PTV News)
 Catherine Vital (2017–2018, moved to PTV News Headlines)
 Diane Querrer (2017, 2018–2020, moved to PTV News)

Reporters
 Bea Bernardo
 Louisa Erispe
 Mark Fetalco
 Allan Francisco
 Deo De Guzman
 Bernard Jaudian Jr.
 Patrick De Jesus
 Mica Ella Joson
 Ryan Lesigues
 Mela Lesmoras 
 Daniel Amos Manalastas
 Kenneth Paciente
 Cleizl Pardilla
 Sandra Samala
 Eunice Samonte
 Stephanie Sevillano
 Naomi Tiburcio
 Karen Villanda

See also
List of programs aired by People's Television Network
Bagong Pilipinas
RadyoBisyon

References

Philippine television news shows
People's Television Network original programming
Breakfast television in the Philippines
Filipino-language television shows
2017 Philippine television series debuts
2020 Philippine television series endings
2020s Philippine television series